Strandissa is a genus of beetles in the family Buprestidae, containing the following species:

 Strandissa limbata (Peringuey, 1892)
 Strandissa vansoni Obenberger, 1941

References

Buprestidae genera